The Sukhoi Su-30 (NATO reporting name: Flanker-C/G/H) is a twin-engine, two-seat supermaneuverable fighter aircraft developed in the Soviet Union by Russia's Sukhoi Aviation Corporation. It is a multirole fighter for all-weather, air-to-air and air interdiction missions.

The Su-30 started as an internal development project in the Sukhoi Su-27 family by Sukhoi. From the Su-27UB two-seat trainer, the Su-27PU heavy interceptor was developed. The design plan was revamped and the Su-27PU was renamed to Su-30 by the Russian Defense Ministry in 1996. Of the Flanker family, the Su-27, Su-30, Su-33, Su-34 and Su-35 have been ordered into limited or serial production by the Russian Defense Ministry.  Later, different export requirements split the Su-30 into two distinct version branches, manufactured by competing organisations: KnAAPO and the Irkut Corporation, both of which come under the Sukhoi aerospace group's umbrella.

KnAAPO manufactures the Su-30MKK and the Su-30MK2, which were designed for and sold to China, and later Indonesia, Uganda, Venezuela, and Vietnam. Due to KnAAPO's involvement from the early stages of developing the Su-35, these are basically a two-seat version of the mid-1990s Su-35. The Chinese chose an older but lighter radar so the canards could be omitted in return for increased payload. It is a fighter with both air supremacy and attack capabilities, generally similar to the U.S. F-15E Strike Eagle.

Irkut traditionally served the Soviet Air Defense and, in the early years of Flanker development, was given the responsibility of manufacturing the Su-27UB, the two-seat trainer version. When India showed interests in the Su-30, Irkut offered the multirole Su-30MKI, which originated as the Su-27UB modified with avionics appropriate for fighters. Along with its ground-attack capabilities, the series adds features for the air-superiority role, such as canards, thrust-vectoring, and a long-range phased-array radar. Its derivatives include the Su-30MKM, MKA, and SM for Malaysia, Algeria, and Russia respectively.  The Russian Air Force operates several Su-30s and has ordered the Su-30SM variant as well.

Development
While the original Su-27 had good range, it still did not have enough range for the Soviet Air Defense Forces (PVO, as opposed to VVS – the Soviet Air Force). The Air Defense Forces needed to cover the vast expanse of the Soviet Union. Hence, development began in 1986 on the Su-27PU, an improved-capability variant of the Su-27 capable of serving as a long-range interceptor or airborne command post.

The two-seat Su-27UB combat trainer was selected as the basis for the Su-27PU, because it had the performance of a single-seat Su-27 with seating for two crew members.  A "proof-of-concept" demonstrator flew 6 June 1987, and this success led to the kick-off of development work on two Su-27PU prototypes. The first Su-27PU flew at Irkutsk on 31 December 1989, and the first of three pre-production models flew on 14 April 1992.

Design

The Su-30 is a multirole fighter. It has a two-seat cockpit with an airbrake behind the canopy. It can serve as an air superiority fighter and as a strike fighter.

Flight characteristics
The integrated aerodynamic configuration, combined with the thrust vectoring control ability, results in high manoeuvrability and unique takeoff and landing characteristics. Equipped with a digital fly-by-wire system, the Su-30 is able to perform some very advanced manoeuvres, including the Pugachev's Cobra and the tailslide. These manoeuvers quickly decelerate the aircraft, causing a pursuing fighter to overshoot, as well as breaking a Doppler radar-lock, as the relative speed of the aircraft drops below the threshold where the signal registers to the radar.

Some variants of the Su-30, notably the Su-30MKI and its derivatives including the Su-30MKM and Su-30SM, are fitted with canards to enhance maneuverability and also compensate for the heavier N011M Bars radar and mission systems in the nose. The canards and the reshaped LERX help control for the vortices and increase the angle-of-attack limit of the airframe, but they also add drag, and reduce the maximum speed to Mach 1.75.

Powerplant
As with the baseline Su-27S/P, the Su-30's powerplant incorporates two Saturn AL-31F afterburning low-bypass turbofan engines, fed through intake ramps. Canted thrust vectoring is used in some variants to enhance maneuverability.

With a normal fuel reserve of 5,270 kg, the Su-30MK is capable of performing a 4.5-hour combat mission with a range of 3,000 km.

Avionics
The aircraft features autopilot ability at all flight stages including low-altitude flight in terrain-following radar mode, and individual and group combat employment against air and ground/sea-surface targets. Automatic control system interconnected with the navigation system ensures route flight, target approach, recovery to airfield and landing approach in automatic mode.

Operational history

Russia

In 1994–1996, an initial batch of five original Su-30 (Su-27PU) fighters, contracted for the Russian Defence Ministry, were delivered to 54th Guards Fighter Aviation Regiment based at Savasleyka air base. After the regiment was disbanded in 2002, the aircraft became part of 4th Centre for Combat Employment and Retraining of Personnel in Lipetsk where they were flown mostly by Russian Falcons aerobatic team. No further orders of the variant were made. However, the Russian Defence Ministry was impressed with the export Su-30MKI's performance envelope and ordered a total of 60 Su-30SM fighters, under two contracts signed in March and December 2012, respectively. On 21 September 2012, the Su-30SM performed its maiden flight. The Russian Air Force has received first two serial aircraft on 22 November 2012. By end of 2015, 31st Fighter Aviation Regiment, the last aviation regiment of the Russian Aerospace Forces that operated Soviet-made MiG-29A/UBs (izdeliye 9.12/9.13) was fully rearmed with about twenty new Su-30SM fighters. All aircraft of the first two contracts were delivered by 2016.

Another 36 aircraft were ordered in April 2016, six of which intended for the Russian Naval Aviation. This was to increase the total number to 116 (88 in the Air Force and 28 in the Navy).

In October–November 2016, eight new aircraft were handed to Russian Knights aerobatic team, replacing the team's six Su-27 fighters. The aircraft are stationed at Kubinka air base, Moscow Oblast.

During the 2017 MAKS International Aviation and Space Salon, it was announced that the Russian Defence Ministry and Irkut Corporation are working on modernization of Russia's Su-30SM fighters to a new "Su-30SM1" standard. The modernization is aimed on improvements in aircraft's avionics and armament.

The Su-30SM attained full operational capability (FOC) in January 2018, by a resolution of the Russian president.

In August 2019, the Russian Defence Ministry first signed a contract for undisclosed number of modernized Su-30SM2 (then referred to it as Su-30SM1) fighters. First deliveries to the Russian Aerospace Forces are scheduled for late 2020 with serial deliveries to commence in 2021. The aircraft will receive the N035 Irbis radar and AL-41F1S engines of the Su-35S, what is to standardize and reduce operational costs of the two variants. The aircraft's armament will be also enhanced of the new KAB-250 aerial bombs and Kh-59MK2 stealth cruise missiles. It is planned to modernize all Russia's Su-30SMs to the SM2 standard.

On 25 August 2020, a contract for 21 modernized Su-30SM2 aircraft for the Russian Naval Aviation was signed at the «ARMY-2020» military-technical forum.

2015 Russian military intervention in Syria

In September 2015, Russia deployed Su-30SM fighters for the first time to Bassel Al-Assad International Airport in Latakia, Syria. At least four Su-30SM fighters were spotted in a satellite photo. In late December 2015, there were 16 Su-30SMs at Khmeimim Air Base. As part of their combat deployment, they provided target illumination for bombers launching airstrikes against rebel groups.

Su-30SMs were initially tasked with aerial escort of Russian attack jets and strategic bombers but conducted also air to ground duties. On 21 March 2017, rebel forces launched a new offensive in the Hama province; a few days later a video emerged showing a Russian Air Force Su-30SM striking ground targets with unguided air-to-ground rockets in a dive attack against the rebels.

On 3 May 2018, a Russian Air Force Su-30 crashed shortly after take-off from the Khmeimim Air Base, killing both crew members.

2022 Russian invasion of Ukraine
Russian Su-30SM and Su-35s fighters were used for air superiority missions during the war. Combined, at least seven air to air victories were reported over Ukrainian jet aircraft and one over a Ukrainian Naval Aviation Mil Mi-14.

A Russian Su-30 was destroyed on the ground by Ukrainian OTR-21 Tochka missiles fired during the Millerovo air base attack. On 5 March 2022 a Russian Naval Aviation Su-30SM was shot down in Bashtanka area, Mykolayiv Oblast. The pilot was captured. On 13 March 2022 another aircraft was lost over Ukraine; the pilot, Kosyk Serhiy Serhiyovych, survived and was captured. On 9 August 2022, explosions at Saky air base in Novofedorivka, Crimea left at least three Su-30s destroyed and one damaged according to satellite imagery. On 18 August a Su-30SM, serial number RF-81771, had its wreckage recorded in Kharkov region in the Izyum direction. The pilot Lt. Col Sergei Kosik was captured. Another Su-30SM, serial number RF-81773 callsign Red 62, was discovered by Ukrainian forces near Izium, Kharkiv. Fate of the pilots is unknown.

India

First talks about acquiring of new fighter for the Indian Air Force began in 1994. A year later, Sukhoi Design Bureau has started working on the new fighter based on the original Su-30 design, which later evolved into Su-30MK (Modernizirovannyi Kommercheskiy - Modernised Commercial) and ultimately into Su-30MKI (Modernizirovannyi Kommercheskiy Indiski - Modernised Commercial Indian). On 30 November 1996, Russian state company Rosvooruzhenie (now Rosoboronexport) and Indian Defence Ministry signed a contract for development and production of eight Su-30Ks and 32 Su-30MKIs for the Indian Air Force. In March–July 1997, all eight Su-30Ks of the order were delivered at Lohegaon Air Force Base in India. On 28 December 2000, as part of the Russian-Indian cooperation, a contract worth more than US$3 billion was signed for license production of 140 Su-30MKI fighters at Hindustan Aeronautics Limited (HAL) production plant in Nashik. Between 2002–2004, in accordance with the 1996 contract, 32 Su-30MKIs were built by Irkutsk Aviation Plant for the Indian Air Force. From 2004 onwards, production is carried by HAL.

In 2007, India was cleared to buy another 40 Su-30MKIs for a total of US$1.6 billion. In March 2010, it was reported India and Russia were negotiating a contract for additional 42 aircraft. The contract worth US$1.6 billion was signed in December 2011, increasing the total number of ordered aircraft up to 272. By March 2020, India had completed the production of all 272 Su-30MKIs licensed under previous contracts. The country was also considering acquisition of 12 more fighters to compensate for Su-30 losses over nearly 20 years of operation. In 2020, due to the 2020–2021 China–India skirmishes, India determined to purchase 12 additional Su-30MKIs.

China

To better counter USAF's expanding capabilities in the region, in 1996, an agreement worth US$1.8 billion was reached with Russia to purchase some 38 multirole combat aircraft based on the original Su-30 design. Taking into account China's requirements for its new fighter, the aircraft became known as Su-30MKK (Modernizirovannyi Kommercheskiy Kitayski - Modernised Commercial Chinese).

In March 1999, first prototype took off from Gromov Flight Research Institute in Russia and a year later it appeared at Zhuhai Air Show in China. People's Liberation Army Air Force (PLAAF) has received first batch of ten Su-30MKK fighters in December 2000, following by second and third batches of ten fighters in August and December 2001, respectively. In July 2001, China has ordered 38 more Su-30MKK fighters.

A modified variant, known as "Su-30MK2", was negotiated for the People's Liberation Army Naval Air Force (PLANAF) in 2002, with contract for 24 aircraft signed in 2003. All the aircraft were delivered to PLANAF in 2004.

Malaysia

Malaysia has ordered 18 Su-30MKMs in May 2003. The first two Su-30MKMs were formally handed over in Irkutsk on 23 May 2007 and arrived in Malaysia at Gong Kedak Air Base in Terengganu on 21 June 2007. As part of the contract agreement, Russia sent the first Malaysian cosmonaut to the International Space Station in October 2007. In 2014, Malaysia had 18 Su-30MKMs in service.

According to Malaysian defense Minister Mohamad Sabu, Malaysia has grounded 14 of 18 Su-30MKM due to engine problems and unavailability of spare parts in 2018. To overcome this problem and increase the readiness of the Su-30MKM fleets, Malaysia has approved the budget worth RM2.2 billion for the Su-30MKM to be upgraded locally by Aerospace Technology Systems Corporation. The first upgraded aircraft was received in 2019 in LIMA 2019 exhibition.

Venezuela

The Government of Venezuela announced on 14 June 2006 it would purchase 24 Su-30MKV fighters from Russia. The first two Su-30MK2s arrived in early December 2006 while another eight were commissioned during 2007; 14 more aircraft arrived in 2008. In October 2015, Venezuela announced the purchase of 12 more Su-30MKVs from Russia for US$480 million.

Algeria

As part of wider US$8 billion deal signed with Russia in 2006, that also included 34 MiG-29 fighters and number of Yak-130 trainers, Algeria has ordered 28 Su-30MKAs for its air force. It was to receive additional 16 Su-30MKAs in exchange for the 39 MiG-29s rejected due to quality disputes and old equipment used. By 2015, it had 44 Su-30MKAs in service with 14 more on order.

In September 2019, Algeria ordered 16 more aircraft. As of 2022, it has 70 Su-30MKAs in service.

Uganda

Uganda signed a contract for six Su-30MK2s in 2010. Deliveries took place between June 2011 and June 2012. In November 2011, one aircraft performed a belly landing at Entebbe International Airport. It was later repaired.

Indonesia

In 2001, reports emerged Indonesia has showed an interest to acquire about 16 Su-30 fighters, as a replacement for its ageing fleet of 12 F-16A/B and F-5E/F fighters. From 2003 to 2011, and because of the U.S-imposed arms embargo against it, it has ordered a combined 11 Su-30MKK/MK2s (2 Su-30MKK and 9 Su-30MK2) for the Air Force. In September 2013, it had all Su-30MKK/MK2s in inventory. The aircraft were upgraded by Belarus in 2019.

Angola
As part of a US$1 billion deal that also includes other equipment and maintenance services for the country, Angola has ordered 12 out of 18 former Indian Su-30K fighters on 16 October 2013. The Su-30Ks were initially delivered to India in 1997–1998, but were returned to Russia in 2007 in exchange for 18 full-fledged Su-30MKI fighters. Angola received first two aircraft in September 2017, four in 2018 and the rest in April 2019. Angolan Su-30Ks were also upgraded to the "SM" standard.

Vietnam
Vietnam has received about 20 Su-30MK2s under two contracts signed in 2009 and 2010, respectively. On 21 August 2013, Russia announced it would deliver another batch of 12 Su-30MK2s under a $450 million contract, with deliveries in 2014–2015.

On 14 June 2016, a Su-30MK2 of the Vietnamese Air Force went missing during a training flight 30–40 km off the coast of Nghệ An Province.  One out of the two pilots survived. At the time, there were some 32 Su-30MK2s in service.

Kazakhstan

Kazakhstan has ordered in total 24 Su-30SM fighters under three contracts. It received first four Su-30SMs under the first contract worth of RUB 5 billion in April 2015. A second contract for eight aircraft was signed in December 2015. First two aircraft of the second order were delivered in December 2016 and another two in December 2017. The third order for 12 more aircraft was approved in August 2017 and eight aircraft were ordered in May 2018. Last four aircraft of the second contract were delivered in December 2018. It had 12 Su-30SMs in service as of December 2018.

Armenia

In January 2016, then Armenian Defense Minister Seyran Ohanyan mentioned that Russia had discussed the possibility of supplying Su-30 fighters to Armenia during a four-day Russian-Armenian intergovernmental commission on bilateral military-technical cooperation. Armenia has ordered four Su-30SMs in February 2019, with deliveries expected to begin in 2020. The country plans to acquire additional Su-30SM aircraft, according to the Armenian Defense Minister David Tonoyan. On 27 December 2019, Armenia has received all four aircraft ahead of schedule. The aircraft landed at the Shirak Airport during a visit of Armenian Defense Minister David Tonoyan and Chief of the General Staff of the Armenian Armed Forces Artak Davtyan. In August 2020, negotiations were under way to acquire a new batch of Su-30SM fighters, according to Armenian Defense Minister David Tonoyan. In March 2021, Nikol Pashinyan, Prime Minister of Armenia, confirmed that Armenia bought Su-30SM fighters without missiles package from Russia. These aircraft were left unused in the 2020 Nagorno-Karabakh war as a result of the purchase of aircraft without missiles.

Belarus
In February 2016, Russia and Belarus concluded a preliminary agreement regarding to the export of an undisclosed number of Su-30s to Belarus. On 20 June 2017, during the Le Bourget international air show, Belarus signed a contract to purchase 12 Su-30SMs under a deal worth US$600 million. Originally to be delivered in 2018, Western embargoes on components delayed delivery, with the first four aircraft arriving at Baranovichi Air Base in November 2019, with four more planned to arrive to 2020 with deliveries completed in 2021.

Potential operators

Iran 
In February 2016, Iran's then Defence Minister Hossein Dehghan during his visit to Moscow announced, that the country intends to buy an undisclosed number of Su-30SM fighters.

Argentina 
In 2021 Russia offered the Argentine Air Force a batch of 15 MiG-29 fighters and another batch of 12 Su-30 fighters and seeks also the sale of Yak-130 training jet and Mil Mi-17 helicopters.

Variants

Early variants
Su-30 (Su-27PU) (Flanker-C)
PU for Punkt Upravlenija - "Control Point" or Perechvatcik Uchebnyj - "Interceptor Trainer". Modernized Su-27UB. 5 units operated by the Russian Air Defence Forces.
Su-30K
Commercial (export) version of the basic Su-30. Initially 8 + 10 with French avionics were delivered to India with plans to upgrade to final Su-30MKI configuration, but later all 18 were returned to Russia, and 12 were resold to Angola.
Su-27KI / Su-30KI
Sukhoi proposal for upgrading Russian AF single seat Su-27S. Also proposed export version for Indonesia, 24 were ordered but subsequently cancelled due to the 1997 Asian Financial Crisis. 1 single-seat demonstrator was produced based on the Su-27SK, later converted to Su-27SKM in 2002.
Su-30KN
Upgrade project for operational two-seat fighters, the Su-27UB, Su-30 and Su-30K. This was cancelled in Russia but later revived as Su-30M2. Belarus consider updating ex-Indian Su-30K to the Su-30KN standard. 
Su-30MK (Flanker-H)
Commercial version of Su-30M first revealed in 1993. 2 were exported to Indonesia in 2003, later upgraded to Su-30MK2.

Su-30MKI and derivatives
Su-30MKI (Flanker-H)
MKI for Modernizirovannyi Kommercheskiy Indiski - "Modernized Commercial Indian". An export version for India, jointly developed with Hindustan Aeronautics Limited (HAL). It is the first Su-30 family member to feature thrust vectoring control (TVC) and canards. Equipped with a multinational avionics complex sourced from Russia, India, France and Israel.
Su-30MKA (Flanker-H)
A version of the Su-30MKI sold to Algeria. All of the Israeli equipment, like the head-up display and the digital map generator, is replaced by Indian equivalents.
Su-30MKM (Flanker-H)
A derivative of the Russian-Indian Su-30MKI, the MKM is a highly specialised version for Royal Malaysian Air Force.  It includes thrust vectoring control (TVC) and canards but with avionics from various countries. It will feature head-up displays (HUD), navigational forward-looking IR system (NAVFLIR) and Damocles Laser Designation pod (LDP) from Thales Group of France, MAW-300 missile approach warning sensor (MAWS), RWS-50 RWR and laser warning sensor (LWS) from SAAB AVITRONICS (South Africa) as well as the Russian NIIP N011M Bars Passive electronically scanned array radar, electronic warfare (EW) system, optical-location system (OLS) and a glass cockpit.
Su-30SM (Flanker-H)
SM for Serijnyi Modernizirovannyi - "Serial Modernized". A specialised version of the thrust-vectoring Su-30MKI for the Russian Air Force, produced by the Irkut Corporation. NATO reporting name Flanker-H. The Su-30SM is considered a 4+ generation fighter jet. The aircraft has been upgraded according to Russian military requirements for radar, radio communications systems, friend-or-foe identification system, ejection seats, weapons, and other aircraft systems. It is equipped with the N011M Bars radar with a maximum detection range 400 km, search range 200 km using a phased array antenna, frontal horizontal fins and steerable thrusters for supermaneuverability as well as with wide-angle HUD. The aircraft can be used to gain air supremacy same as for targeting adversary on the ground using wide range of weapons including air-to-air, air-to-surface and guided and unguided bombs with total weapons weight up to 8,000 kg. It is also equipped with the one barrel, 30 mm GSh-30-1 autocannon. To ensure operations at major distances from airfield, the ability of in-flight refueling (IFR) is included. Besides that, for electronic warfare purposes two SAP-518 jamming pods can be fitted on the wing tips. The SAP-518 is designed to protect the aircraft from various air-to-air and surface-to-air missiles by creating false targets, jamming missile's guidance, enemy aircraft radars or ground and seaborne air defence.
Su-30SME (Flanker-H)
Su-30SME is the export version of the Su-30SM, with foreign avionics of other Su-30MKI derivatives replaced with Russian systems, and the possible downgrade of certain systems such as the radar modes and fire control. It was unveiled at the Singapore Airshow 2016, and has been offered to Iran, Bangladesh, Uzbekistan, and Myanmar.

Su-30SM2
Initially referred to it as SM1, is an upgrade project of Russian Su-30SM fighters, equipped with the N035 Irbis radar and more powerful AL-41F1S engines of the Su-35S, with the goal to reduce operational costs when unifying the two fighters. The modernized fighters will also obtain new types of weapons, namely the KAB-250 aerial bombs and Kh-59MK2 stealth cruise missile. First deliveries are scheduled for end-2020.

Su-30MKK and derivatives
Su-30MKK (Flanker-G)
MKK for Modernizirovanniy Kommercheskiy Kitayskiy - "Modernized Commercial for China". An export version for China. NATO reporting name Flanker-G.
Su-30MK2 (Flanker-G+)
Modernized Su-30MKK for China, Indonesia and Uganda with advanced avionics and weapons.
Su-30MKV/Su-30MK2 AMV (Flanker-G+)
Export version of Su-30MK2 for Venezuela built on Su-35 airframe,and thus is slightly smaller than the standard Su-30MK2.To avoid confusion after Vietnam also placed an order for Su-30MK2, the designation for those ordered by Venezuela was changed from the original Su-30MKV to Su-30MK2 AMV with AMV stands for Aviacion Militar Venezolana (Venezuelan Military Aviation).
Su-30MK2V (Flanker-G+)
Export version of Su-30MK2 for Vietnam with modifications such as redesigned ejection seat to accommodate the smaller body frames of Vietnamese pilots, and other minor modification of upgrading communications gear.The original designation Su-30MKV caused confusion with those Su-30MK2s ordered by Venezuela, which already had Su-30MKV designation, so to avoid confusion, Su-30MK2s ordered by Vietnam was redesignated Su-30MK2V. Vietnam still internally designates it Su-30MK2 with the MK2V designation rarely used.
Su-30M2 (Flanker-G+)
A Su-30MK2 version developed by KnAAPO. The Russian Air Force placed an initial order for the variant in 2009. Factory tests were completed in September 2010. Twenty aircraft have been ordered; 4 in 2009 and 16 in 2012. At least 12 have been produced as of August 2014, all four from the first contract in 2009, and eight from the second contract of 2012. They are mostly to be used as combat training aircraft for Su-30SM/SM2 and Su-35 fighters.

Operators

 Algerian Air Force – 70 Su-30MKA (2022)

 Angolan Air Force – 12 Su-30Ks in inventory.

 Armenian Air Force – 4 Su-30SMs in inventory.

 Belarusian Air Force – 4 Su-30SMs in inventory as of November 2019, 12 ordered.

 Indian Air Force – 272 Su-30MKIs in inventory, with 12 more ordered.

 Indonesian Air Force – 11 Su-30MK2s in inventory.

 Kazakh Air Force – 12 Su-30SMs in inventory as of December 2018 with three new deliveries in November and December 2020 and in 2021.

 Royal Malaysian Air Force – 18 Su-30MKMs in inventory.

 Myanmar Air Force – 6 Su-30SME ordered in 2018. 2 Su-30SMEs delivered in March 2022 and entered service on 15 December. Between 4 and 6 have arrived as of November 2022.

 People's Liberation Army Air Force – 73 Su-30MKKs in inventory.
 People's Liberation Army Naval Air Force – 24 Su-30MK2s in inventory.

 Russian Air Force – 91 Su-30SM and 19 Su-30M2 in service as of 2021.
 Russian Naval Aviation – 22+ Su-30SMs in inventory, 21 Su-30SM2s on order, 4 delivered, a new delivery in November 2022, 50 aircraft planned in total.

 Ugandan Air Force – 6 Su-30MK2s in inventory.

 Venezuelan Air Force – 22 Su-30MKVs in inventory.

 Vietnam People's Air Force – 35 Su-30MK2(V)s in inventory.

Specifications (Su-27PU/Su-30)

Accidents

 On 12 June 1999, a Russian Su-30MK crashed at the Paris Air Show, Le Bourget, France. Both pilots ejected safely and no one was hurt on the ground.
 On 22 September 2020, a Russian Su-30M2 was shot down by a Su-35S during air combat training which pitted two Su-35S against one Su-30M2. When the pilot of a Su-35S pulled the trigger to record the simulated hit, the jet fired a burst from its 30mm GSh-30-1 cannon, hitting the right wing of the Su-30M2, leaving the aircraft uncontrollable and forcing its crew to eject.
 On 23 October 2022, a Russian Su-30SM crashed into a residential building in the Siberian city of Irkutsk during a test flight. Pilots Maxim Konyushin and Viktor Kryukov died in the crash, but there were no casualties on the ground. Investigators suspect that the aircraft's oxygen system had been refilled with nitrogen, which caused both pilots to become unconscious and lose control of the aircraft in flight.

Notable appearances in media

See also

References

Further reading

External links

 Official ; Official  and 
 Su-30 page on milavia.net
 Sukhoi Flankers – The Shifting Balance of Regional Air Power
 Su-30 page on Fighter Tactics Academy site
 Asia's Advanced Flankers on ausairpower.net
 Sukhoi Su-30 photo pool on Flickr

Canard aircraft
1980s Soviet fighter aircraft
Su-30
Twinjets
Vehicles introduced in 1996
Aircraft first flown in 1989
Fourth-generation jet fighter